Daniel Hand (July 16, 1801 - 1891) was an American businessman, abolitionist, and philanthropist from Connecticut. He funded construction of Hand Academy that became Daniel Hand High School in Connecticut. He established a fund to educate African Americans in the South. He was born in Madison, Connecticut.

References

1801 births
1891 deaths
American abolitionists
19th-century American businesspeople
People from Madison, Connecticut
19th-century American philanthropists
Founders of schools in the United States
People from Guilford, Connecticut
People from Augusta, Georgia
Businesspeople from Connecticut
Philanthropists from Connecticut
Christians from Connecticut